Bùi Tiến Dũng (born 2 October 1995) is a Vietnamese professional footballer who plays as a defender for V.League 1 club Viettel and the Vietnam national team.

International career
Tiến Dũng made his international debut against Cambodia on November 27, 2016. Coming on as a substitute in their 2–1 win.

Dũng played for Vietnam in the 2018 AFC U-23 Championship. In the quarter-final against Iraq, which ended 3-3 after 120 minutes, Dũng succeeded in the final penalty, leading Vietnam to the semi-final.
Vietnam later advanced to the final, where they lost 1-2 to Uzbekistan.

In the Asian Games 2018 in Palembang, Dũng was the one who made the pass from the home field, eventually assisting Nguyễn Văn Toàn's decisive goal against Syria on August 27.

Bùi Tiến Dũng was also in Vietnam squad in the AFF Suzuki Cup 2018, where they ultimately lifted the trophy after defeating Malaysia 3-2 on aggregate.

In the 2019 AFC Asian Cup's round of 16 against Jordan, Dũng successfully delivered the decisive penalty kick, helping Vietnam to win 4-2 in the penalty shoots-out.

Career statistics

International

International goal

Honours
Viettel
V.League 1: 2020
V.League 2: 2018; Runner-up: 2016
Vietnamese National Cup runner-up: 2020
Vietnamese Super Cup runner-up: 2021
Vietnam U23/Olympic
Southeast Asian Games bronze medal: 2015
AFC U-23 Championship runner-up: 2018
Asian Games fourth place: 2018
VFF Cup: 2018
Vietnam 
AFF Championship: 2018; runner-up: 2022
VFF Cup: 2022
King's Cup runner-up: 2019

References 

1995 births
Living people
Vietnamese footballers
Association football central defenders
Hoang Anh Gia Lai FC players
V.League 1 players
People from Hà Tĩnh province
Vietnam international footballers
Southeast Asian Games bronze medalists for Vietnam
Southeast Asian Games medalists in football
Footballers at the 2018 Asian Games
2019 AFC Asian Cup players
Competitors at the 2015 Southeast Asian Games
Competitors at the 2017 Southeast Asian Games
Asian Games competitors for Vietnam